The inaugural Sheffield City Region mayoral election was held on 3 May 2018 to elect the mayor of the Sheffield City Region. The mayor will lead the Sheffield City Region Combined Authority. Voting is restricted to the four councils which are constituent members of the combined authority: Barnsley, Doncaster, Rotherham and Sheffield. Together these councils make up South Yorkshire.

As the election took place using the supplementary vote system, electors were able to vote for a "first preference" candidate and a "second preference" candidate. The leading candidate needed to achieve over 50% of the first preference votes in order to be elected in the first round. As the leading candidate, Dan Jarvis, received 47.1% of the total number of votes in the first round, the election proceeded to the second round and voters second preferences were distributed between the two leading candidates. Dan Jarvis, the Labour and Co-operative candidate, was subsequently elected in the second round with a total number of 144,154 votes.

Subsequent elections will be held in May 2022 and every four years after.

Electoral system
The election used a supplementary vote system, in which voters express a first and second preference of candidates.
 If a candidate receives over 50% of the first preference vote the candidate wins.
 If no candidate receives an overall majority, i.e., over 50% of first preference votes, the top two candidates proceed to a second round and all other candidates are eliminated. 
 The first preference votes for the remaining two candidates stand in the final count. 
 Voters' ballots whose first and second preference candidates are eliminated are discarded.
 Voters whose first preference candidates have been eliminated and whose second preference candidate is in the top two have their second preference votes added to the count. 
This means that the winning candidate has the support of a majority of voters who expressed a preference among the top two.

All registered electors (British, Irish, Commonwealth and European Union citizens) living in the combined authority area aged 18 or over on 3 May 2018 were entitled to vote in the mayoral election.

Results

Overall

By area

Barnsley

Doncaster

Rotherham

Sheffield

Candidates

Conservative Party
 Ian Walker, parliamentary candidate for Sheffield Hallam in 2015 and 2017

Green Party of England and Wales 

 Rob Murphy, Speaker for the Green Group on Sheffield Council

English Democrats

 David Allen

Labour Party

 Dan Jarvis, MP for Barnsley Central from 2011 onwards, was selected to stand in a ballot of Labour Party members. Jarvis was also selected by the Co-operative Party and stood as a joint Labour and Co-operative candidate.

Liberal Democrats
 Hannah Kitching, businessperson and campaigner

South Yorkshire Save Our NHS
 Naveen Judah

Yorkshire Party

 Mick Bower, candidate for Rotherham in 2017

Endorsements

Dan Jarvis 

 David Blunkett
 Kevin Barron
 Ed Miliband
 Stephanie Peacock
 Rosie Winterton

Naveen Judah 

 National Health Action Party

References

2018 English local elections
Mayoral elections in England